New York State Route 31A (NY 31A) is an east–west state highway located in the western part of New York in the United States. It serves as a southerly alternate route of NY 31 from the western part of Orleans County to the far western part of Monroe County. It diverges from NY 31 south of the village of Medina and parallels NY 31 eastward until it reconnects to its parent route southwest of the village of Brockport. While NY 31 passes through the villages of Medina, Albion, and Holley, NY 31A bypasses all three, serving sparsely populated areas to their south instead. The route intersects NY 98 south of Albion and NY 237 in Clarendon.

The origins of NY 31A date back to the 1930 renumbering of state highways in New York when the section of modern NY 31 between Middleport and Medina was designated as New York State Route 3A. It was renumbered to New York State Route 3B  and extended northeastward to Knowlesville via Millville by 1932 before becoming NY 31A . The section of modern NY 31 and NY 31A from NY 19 in Brockport to Clarendon was designated as New York State Route 3B in 1930, but was renumbered to New York State Route 3C  and the west end was cut back to the Monroe–Orleans county line before becoming New York State Route 31D . NY 31A was cut back to its current western terminus in 1949 and extended eastward to NY 19 and NY 31 in Brockport , replacing NY 31D. The route was truncated to its current eastern terminus in the early 1980s after NY 31 was altered to bypass Brockport to the southwest.

Route description

NY 31A begins at a four-way intersection in the southern portion of the village of Medina. At this junction, NY 31 travels to the west and to the north (eastbound), NY 63 travels to the north and to the south, and NY 31A travels to the east as Maple Ridge Road. It leaves the village shortly afterward, entering a rural area of Orleans County dominated by open fields. The route heads due east to Millville, a small hamlet situated at the junction of NY 31A and East Shelby Road in northeastern Shelby. At the eastern edge of the community, NY 31A meets West County House Road, the former routing of NY 31A toward Knowlesville.

Past Millville, NY 31A becomes West Lee Road and heads southeastward through farmland to the Barre town line, at which point the route turns back to the east and follows a slightly northeasterly alignment for  into the town of Albion. Here, NY 31A passes the Benjamin Franklin Gates House, situated on the north side of the route near a junction with Mix Road. The route briefly reenters Barre along this stretch, heading south and east across the town's northeastern corner on its way into the town of Clarendon.

At this point, NY 31A turns southeast to serve Clarendon, where NY 31A intersects NY 237 in the center of the hamlet. Upon crossing NY 237, NY 31A changes names for the final time, becoming Fourth Section Road. The rural surroundings return outside of Clarendon hamlet as a mix of woodlands and fields, which NY 31A progresses generally northeasterly through to the hamlet of Bennetts Corners. Here, the amount of development along the route begins to increase, a change ushered in by a pair of large housing tracts in the eastern part of the community.

East of Bennetts Corners, the route takes on a more easterly alignment as it crosses into Monroe County, which contains just  of the  NY 31A. In Monroe County, the highway passes through a slightly more populated area on its way to a junction with NY 31 and NY 19 Truck southwest of the village of Brockport. Both NY 19 Truck and NY 31 enter the intersection from the north on Redman Road and turn east at Fourth Section Road, following the right-of-way of NY 31A eastward toward Brockport's business district. The junction completes the alternate loop of NY 31, which follows a parallel but more northerly routing between Medina and Brockport that takes it through the villages of Medina, Albion, and Holley.

History

Most of modern NY 31 west of Rochester—including the section between Gasport and the outskirts of Brockport—was originally designated as part of NY 3 when the first set of posted routes in New York were assigned in 1924. In the 1930 renumbering of state highways in New York, NY 3 was realigned between Middleport and Medina to follow what is now NY 31E. NY 3's former routing between the two villages was designated as NY 3A. NY 3A was redesignated as NY 3B  as part of a renumbering of NY 3's suffixed routes. NY 3B was also extended eastward along Maple Ridge, County House, and Taylor Hill Roads to meet NY 31 at Knowlesville Station (a hamlet in the town of Ridgeway) by this time. The route was renumbered again , becoming NY 31A after NY 3 was replaced with a realigned NY 31 west of Rochester.

Farther east, the segment of modern NY 31A from Clarendon to Brockport and what is now NY 31 from NY 31A to NY 19 became NY 3B in the 1930 renumbering. Like NY 3A, NY 3B was renumbered to NY 3C ; however, it was also truncated to consist solely of the Monroe County portion of its routing at this time. The route now began at the Monroe–Orleans county line, where state maintenance of Fourth Section Road began, and ended at the junction of NY 63 (now NY 19) and NY 3 (NY 31) south of Brockport. NY 3C was redesignated as NY 31D  following NY 31's supplantation of NY 3 west of Rochester.

On January 1, 1949, NY 31 was rerouted between Middleport and Medina to use NY 31A between the two locations. NY 31A was truncated to its current western terminus in Medina as a result. It was substantially extended , however, to a new eastern terminus in Brockport. The highway was rerouted east of Millville to follow a series of previously unnumbered roads through Barre and Clarendon to Monroe County, where it supplanted NY 31D from the county line eastward. NY 31A was truncated slightly to its current eastern terminus in the early 1980s after NY 31 was rerouted to bypass Brockport to the west and south on NY 31A and Redman Road.

Major intersections

See also

List of county routes in Orleans County, New York

References

External links

031A
Transportation in Monroe County, New York
Transportation in Orleans County, New York